Gregg Dechert (born May 11, 1952, in Listowel, Ontario, Canada) is a Canadian keyboardist and guitarist. He was the keyboardist for Uriah Heep between July 1980 and March 1981, replacing Ken Hensley. He also performed keyboards and vocals with David Gilmour on his first solo tour, appearing on its video live album. He played with Bad Company on their comeback album Fame and Fortune in 1986 and its accompanying tour on keyboards and guitar. He also played with The Dream Academy, Feather Wheel, Trev John, Pulsar, Mike Maves, and In A World.

Discography 
 Fame and Fortune – Bad Company (1986)
 The Dream Academy – The Dream Academy (1985)
Featherwheel – Featherwheel
Standpoint – Trev John
This Side Of Town – Mike Maves
"Think It Over" (single) – Uriah Heep (1980)
"Heart of A Lion (Maestro Anjael)

References

Canadian rock keyboardists
Uriah Heep (band) members
Musicians from Ontario
Living people
1952 births